European route E 931 is a European B class road in Italy, connecting the city Mazara del Vallo – Gela.

Route 
 
 Mazara del Vallo
 Castelvetrano
 Gela

External links 
 UN Economic Commission for Europe: Overall Map of E-road Network (2007)
 International E-road network

International E-road network
Roads in Italy